ZT may refer to:

Arts and entertainment:
 Zero Tolerance (game), a 1994 video game for Sega Genesis console
 The Zimmer Twins,  a Canadian animated series and website
 Zoo Tycoon (series), a video game series
 Zoo Tycoon, the first game in the series

Science and technology:
 Zeitgeber time, an indication of circadian rhythm cycle time
 Zettatesla, an SI unit of magnetic flux density
 Zolpidem Tartrate, a popular prescription sleep medication commonly known by the brand name Ambien
 zT, a figure of merit for the maximum energy conversion efficiency of thermoelectric materials

Other uses:
 Zero Two, a Darling in the Franxx character.
 MG ZT, an executive car made by MG Rover
 Zero tolerance, a non-discretionary rules enforcement policy
 Zero Tolerance Knives, a knife brand from Kai USA
 Zero-turn mower, a type of lawn mowing equipment
 ZT, IATA code for Titan Airways